State Route 166 (SR 166) is a north–south state highway in southern Middle Tennessee, traversing Giles and Maury counties.

Route description

Giles County

Alabama State Route 127 becomes SR 166 at the Alabama state line in the Bethel community of southern Giles County. SR 166 goes north as a 2-lane highway and intersects SR 273, and then goes north through rural and hilly terrain before coming to an intersection with US 64 and entering Pulaski. SR 166 then becomes concurrent with SR 11, widens to an undivided 4-lane highway, and crosses a bridge over Richland Creek to enter downtown and come to an intersection with SR 15, where SR 166 splits from SR 11 to follow SR 15 west as a 2-lane. They then leave downtown and comes to another intersection with US 64, where they become concurrent with US 64 and SR 15 becomes unsigned. They then leave Pulaski and continue west as a 4-lane undivided highway for a little over a mile SR 166 splits off from US 64/SR 15 and turns northward as a 2-lane highway. SR 166 then passes through rural areas before passing through Campbellsville and having an intersection with SR 245. It then continues north to cross into Maury County.

Maury County

SR 166 continues northwest to enter Mount Pleasant, where it intersects and becomes concurrent with SR 243. They then enter downtown, where SR 166 splits off and goes west to have an intersection with US 43 (SR 6). SR 166 then turns northwest to leave Mount Pleasant and pass through rural areas before entering Hampshire and coming to an end at an intersection with US 412 (SR 99).

Major intersections

See also

References
Mileage retrieved from DeLorme Street Atlas USA
Official Tennessee Highway Maps

External links
Tennessee Department of Transportation

166
166
166